The Church Mission Society (CMS), formerly known as the Church Missionary Society, is a British mission society working with the Christians around the world. Founded in 1799, CMS has attracted over nine thousand men and women to serve as mission partners during its 200-year history. The society has also given its name "CMS" to a number of daughter organisations around the world, including Australia and New Zealand, which have now become independent.

History

Foundation
The original proposal for the mission came from Charles Grant and George Uday of the East India Company and David Brown, of Calcutta, who sent a proposal in 1787 to William Wilberforce, then a young member of parliament, and Charles Simeon, a young clergyman at Cambridge University.

The Society for Missions to Africa and the East (as the society was first called) was founded on 12 April 1799 at a meeting of the Eclectic Society, supported by members of the Clapham Sect, a group of activist Anglicans who met under the guidance of John Venn, the Rector of Clapham. Their number included Charles Simeon, Basil Woodd, Henry Thornton, Thomas Babington and William Wilberforce. Wilberforce was asked to be the first president of the society, but he declined to take on this role and became a vice-president. The treasurer was Henry Thornton and the founding secretary was Thomas Scott, a biblical commentator. Many of the founders were also involved in creating the Sierra Leone Company and the Society for the Education of Africans.

The first missionaries went out in 1804. They came from the Evangelical-Lutheran Church in Württemberg and had trained at the Berlin Seminary. The name Church Missionary Society began to be used and in 1812 the society was renamed The Church Missionary Society.

In 1829, the CMS began to send medical personnel as missionaries. Initially to care for the mission staff, these missionaries could also care for the physical well-being of local populations. Dr. Henry Graham was the first CMS Medical missionary when he was sent to Sierra Leone and shifted the focus from care of the mission staff to assistance for local people.

Missions
In 1802 Josiah Pratt was appointed secretary, a position he held until 1824, becoming an early driving force in the CMS. The principal missions, the founding missionaries, and the dates of the establishment of the missions are:

 West Africa (1804): Melchior Renner and Peter Hartwig were sent to the Pongo River, the country of the Susu people in Guinea. The West Africa mission was extended to Sierra Leone (1816). Samuel Ajayi Crowther, a Yoruba by birth, was selected to accompany the missionary James Schön on the Niger expedition of 1841.  Crowther (later appointed first African Anglican bishop in Nigeria) was the principal missionary to Yorubaland in 1844 and the Niger in 1857. 
 West Indies (1813): The CMS started work in Antigua and expanded to other islands. By 1838 the CMS had congregations of 8,000, with 13 ordained missionaries, 23 lay teachers and 70 schools. In about 1848 a shortage of funds resulted in the CMS withdrawing from the West Indies.
 New Zealand (1814): Samuel Marsden became the chaplain of the penal colony at Parramatta, Australia in 1774. Samuel Marsden attempted to establish a mission in New Zealand in 1809, however it was not until 1814 that the CMS mission in New Zealand was established when Marsden officiated at its first service on Christmas Day in 1814, at Oihi Bay in the Bay of Islands.
 India (1814): William Carey, the founder of the Baptist Missionary Society was the pioneer of the Evangelical, Protestant missionary movement in India who arrived in 1793. The CMS Mission in India began in 1814 when 7 missionaries arrived: two were placed at Chennai (Madras), two at Bengal and three at Travancore (1816). The Indian missions were extended in the following years to a number of locations including Agra, Meerut district, Varanasi  (Benares), Mumbai  (Bombay) (1820), Tirunelveli (Tinnevelly) (1820), Kolkata (Calcutta) (1822), Telugu Country (1841) and the Punjab region (1852). While the Revolt of 1857 resulted in damage to the missions in the North West Provinces, after the revolt the CMS expanded its missions to Oudh, Allahabad, the Santhal people (1858), and to Kashmir (1865). 
 Middle East (1815): William Jowett was appointed to commence the Mediterranean Mission, however the mission was only intermittently able to establish missions in Ottoman Turkey in 1819–21 as the result of resistance to the Christian faith by the Turkish authorities; an attempt in 1862 to open a mission station in Constantinople also failed. 
 Sri Lanka (Ceylon) (1817):  Four CMS missionaries were sent to Ceylon in 1817 and in the following 5 years mission stations were established at Kandy, Baddegama, Kotte (Cotta) and Jaffna. In 1850 a mission station was established at Colombo.
 North West America Mission (Canada) (1822): The CMS provided financial assistance in 1820 to John West, chaplain to the Hudson’s Bay Company, towards the education of some Native American children, including James Settee of the Swampy Cree nation, Charles Pratt (Askenootow) and Henry Budd of the Cree nation. In 1822 the CMS appointed West to head the mission in what was then known as the Red River Colony in what is now the province of Manitoba. He was succeeded in 1823 by David Jones who was joined by William Cockram and his wife in 1825. The North West America Mission was extended to the people of the Blackfoot Confederacy in Saskatchewan (1840), the Cree and Inuit of Hudson Bay (1851), the Anishinaabe of Manitoba and towards the Arctic Circle to the Naskapi (Innu) (1858–1862).
 Egypt (1825) and Ethiopia (1827): Five missionaries were sent to Egypt in 1825. The CMS concentrated the Mediterranean Mission on the Coptic Church and in 1830 to its daughter Ethiopian Church, which included the creation of a translation of the Bible in Amharic at the instigation of William Jowett, as well as the posting of two missionaries to Ethiopia (Abyssinia), Samuel Gobat (later the Anglican Bishop of Jerusalem) and Christian Kugler arrived in that country in 1827. Charles Isenberg (1806–64) joined the Abyssinian mission in 1835, followed by Johann Ludwig Krapf (1810–81) in 1837. The missionaries were expelled from Abyssinia in 1844. The Egyptian Mission was abandoned by the CMS in 1862. The Egyptian Mission was revived in 1882 by Frederick Augustus Klein. Francis John Harpur established CMS hospitals and clinics around Egypt in 1889 including a hospital in Old Cairo and the Harpur Memorial Hospital in Menouf(1910).
 Australia (1825): William Watson and Johann Simon Christian Handt arrived to establish the Wellington Valley Mission near to Wellington, New South Wales. However, because of drought and the lack of success of the mission, the CMS withdrew. In 1892 CMS Associations were set up in New South Wales and Victoria. In 1916 the Church Missionary Association of Australia was formed, which was later renamed the Church Missionary Society of Australia. By 1927 the CMS Australia was active in the Northern Territory, Australia, including in communities along the Roper River in the Katherine region.
 South Africa (1837): Captain Allen Francis Gardiner R.N. obtained the permission of Dingaan, a Zulu chief, to establish a CMS mission. Francis Owen arriving in August 1837, followed by W. Hewetson and a surgeon, R. Philips. However, following an armed conflict between the Zulus and the newly arrived Voortrekkers (Boers), the CMS abandoned the mission.
 East Africa (1844): Johann Ludwig Krapf was in Abyssinia, however when the missionaries were forced out he moved to Mombasa. CMS missionaries, such as Krapf and Johannes Rebmann, explored East and Central Africa, with Rebmann being the first European to reach Mount Kilimanjaro (1848) and Krapf was the first to reach Mount Kenya (1849). The East Africa Mission was revived in 1874 and extended to inland, Uganda (1877) and Tanganyika (1878). 
Uganda (1877): Alexander Mackay established a mission in the historical kingdom of Buganda, now part of Uganda. On 29 October 1885, Kabaka Mwanga II had the incoming Anglican bishop James Hannington assassinated on the eastern border of his kingdom and he also ordered the execution of Christian converts among his people. Later the Uganda mission was centered at Kampala and was led by missionary brothers Albert Ruskin Cook and John Howard Cook. 
Ruanda-Urundi (1916–1919): The Ruanda Mission stations were later established in Ruanda-Urundi as medical missions by Drs. Algernon Stanley Smith and Leonard Sharp. This later became the independent Mid-Africa Ministry but was reincorporated into CMS in 1999. The Ruanda mission was divided into missions for Rwanda (1919) and Burundi (1934) with 1962 independence of each country.
 China (1844): Robert Morrison, of the London Missionary Society established a mission in Guangzhou (Canton) in 1808. After the First Opium War, Hong Kong came under the control of Great Britain and ports on the mainland, including Canton and Shanghai, become open to Europeans. In 1844 the South China Mission was established by George Smith (later Bishop of Victoria, H.K.) and Thomas McClatchie at Shanghai. In 1850, William Welton opened the first CMS medical mission, a dispensary hospital, in China. the work of CMS in China was carried out by a branch organization the Church Missionary Society in China. In 1883, a mission, hospital, and leper colony were started in Pakhoi (now Beihai) by Edward Horder and later Leopold G. Hill.
 Palestine (1851): Frederick Augustus Klein arrived in Nazareth in 1851 where he lived for 5–6 years, then he moved to Jerusalem until 1877. In 1855 John Zeller was sent to Nablus. In 1857, he moved to Nazareth, where he stayed for the next 20 years, then he moved to Jerusalem. Edith Eleanor Newton began a mission in 1887 and served as the Sister Head of the Medical Mission Hospital. In 1892, she became owner and operator of the Jaffa Mission Hospital.
 Mauritius (1854): Bishop Vincent W Ryan was appointed the bishop of Mauritius in 1854 and the same year David Fenn established a mission station.
 North Pacific Mission (British Columbia) (1857): William Duncan, a lay missionary, arrived at the remote Hudson's Bay Company (HBC) fort settlement at Lax Kw'alaams, British Columbia, then part of HBC's New Caledonia district and known as Fort Simpson or Port Simpson. His work included founding the Tsimshian communities of Metlakatla, British Columbia, in Canada, and Metlakatla, Alaska, in the United States. R. S. Tugwell joined the mission in October 1860. In the early 1870s William Collison served with Duncan in Metlakatla. Collison extended the work of the North Pacific Mission to the Haida people  of the archipelago of Haida Gwaii (formerly the Queen Charlotte Islands) in northern British Columbia. Robert Tomlinson, a medical missionary, re-established Robert A. Doolan's three-year-old Anglican mission among the Nisga'a people by relocating it from the lower Nass River to a newly established community, Kincolith (today known as Gingolx), at the mouth of the Nass River.
 Madagascar (1863): Two CMS missionaries operated a mission station from 1863 until their deaths in 1864.
 Tanzania (1864): The Universities' Mission to Central Africa and the Church Missionary Society began work in 1864 and 1878 at Mpwapwa. The Province was inaugurated in 1970 following the division of the Province of East Africa into the Province of Kenya and the Province of Tanzania.
 Japan (1868): George Ensor established a mission station at Nagasaki and in 1874 he was replaced by H Burnside. The same year the mission was expanded to include C. F. Warren at Osaka, Philip Fyson at Yokohama, J. Piper at Tokyo (Yedo), H. Evington at Niigata and W. Dening at Hokkaido. H. Maundrell joined the Japan mission in 1875 and served at Nagasaki. John Batchelor was a missionary to the Ainu people of Hokkaido from 1877 to 1941. Hannah Riddell arrived in Kumamoto, Kyūshū in 1891. She worked to establish the Kaishun Hospital (known in English as the Kumamoto Hospital of the Resurrection of Hope) for the treatment of Leprosy, with the hospital opening on 12 November 1895. Hannah Riddell left the CMS in 1900 to run the hospital.
Iran (Persia) (1869): Henry Martyn visited Persia in 1811, however the Persian Mission was not established until 1869 when Robert Bruce established a mission station at Julfa in Ispahan. The mission in Persia expanded to include Kerman, Yezd (1893) and Shiraz (1900). After Bishop Edward Stuart resigned as the Bishop of Waiapu in New Zealand, he then served as a missionary in Julfa from 1894 to 1911.
 Iraq (1883): the CMS started work in Baghdad in 1883 and expanded to Mosul in 1901.
 Sudan (1899): Llewellyn Gwynne, Archibald Shaw and Dr Frank Harpur established mission stations in Northern Sudan at Omdurman (1899) and Khartoum (1900). The first station in Southern Sudan was established by Archibald Shaw at Malek, near Bor, South Sudan (1905).

Up to 1886 the Society had entered 103 women, unmarried or widows, on its list, and the Annual Report for 1886–87 showed twenty-two then on its staff, the majority being widows or daughters of missionaries. From the beginning of the organisation until 1894 the total number of CMS missionaries amounted to 1,335 (men) and 317 (women). During this period the indigenous clergy ordained by the branch missions totalled 496 and about 5,000 lay teachers had been trained by the branch missions. In 1894 the active members of the CMS totalled: 344 ordained missionaries, 304 indigenous clergy (ordained by the branch missions) and 93 lay members of the CMS. As of 1894, in addition to the missionary work, the CMS operated about 2,016 schools, with about 84,725 students.

In the first 25 years of the CMS nearly half the missionaries were Germans trained in Berlin and later from the Basel Seminary. The Church Missionary Society College, Islington opened in 1825 and trained about 600 missionaries; about 300 joined the CMS from universities and about 300 came from other sources. 30 CMS missionaries were appointed to the episcopate, serving as bishops.

The CMS published The Church Missionary Gleaner, from April 1841 to September 1857. From 1813 to 1855 the society published The Missionary Register, "containing an abstract of the principal missionary and bible societies throughout the world". From 1816, "containing the principal transactions of the various institutions for propagating the gospel with the proceedings at large of the Church Missionary Society".

Training
During the late 19th and early 20th century, the CMS maintained a training program for women at Kennaway Hall at the former "Willows" estate where the training program started.  Kennaway Hall was the Church Missionary Society training center for female missionaries. The training center was called "The Willows," under the Mildmay Trustees, until having been bought by the Church Missionary Society in 1891. Elizabeth Mary Wells took over the presidency in 1918 of Kennaway Hall.

20th century

During the early 20th century, the society's theology moved in a more liberal direction under the leadership of Eugene Stock. There was considerable debate over the possible introduction of a doctrinal test for missionaries, which advocates claimed would restore the society's original evangelical theology. In 1922, the society split, with the liberal evangelicals remaining in control of CMS headquarters, whilst conservative evangelicals established the Bible Churchmen's Missionary Society (BCMS, now Crosslinks).

In 1957 the Church of England Zenana Missionary Society was absorbed into the CMS.

Notable general secretaries of the society later in the 20th century were Max Warren and John Vernon Taylor. The first woman president of the CMS, Diana Reader Harris (serving 1969–1982), was instrumental in persuading the society to back the 1980 Brandt Report on bridging the North-South divide. In the 1990s CMS appointed its first non-British general secretary, Michael Nazir-Ali, who later became Bishop of Rochester in the Church of England, and its first women general secretary, Diana Witts. Gillian Joynson-Hicks was its president from 1998 to 2007.

In 1995 the name was changed to the Church Mission Society.

At the end of the 20th century there was a significant swing back to the Evangelical position, probably in part due to a review in 1999 at the anniversary and also due to the re-integration of Mid Africa Ministry (formerly the Ruanda Mission). The position of CMS is now that of an ecumenical Evangelical society.

21st century

In 2004 CMS was instrumental in bringing together a number of Anglican and, later, some Protestant mission agencies to form Faith2Share, an international network of mission agencies.

In June 2007, CMS in Britain moved the administrative office out of London for the first time. It is now based in east Oxford.

In 2008, CMS was acknowledged as a mission community by the Advisory Council on the Relations of Bishops and Religious Communities of the Church of England. It currently has approximately 2,800 members who commit to seven promises, aspiring to live a lifestyle shaped by mission.

In 2010 CMS integrated with the South American Mission Society (SAMS).

In 2010 Church Mission Society launched the Pioneer Mission Leadership Training programme, providing leadership training for both lay people and those preparing for ordination as pioneer ministers. It is accredited by Durham University as part of the Church of England's Common Awards. In 2015 there were 70 students on the course, studying at certificate, diploma and MA level.

In October 2012, Philip Mounstephen became the Executive Leader of the Church Mission Society.

On 31 January 2016 Church Mission Society had 151 mission partners in 30 countries and 62 local partners in 26 countries (this programme supports local mission leaders in Asia, Africa and South America in "pioneer settings") serving in Africa, Asia, Europe and the Middle East. In addition, 127 mission associates (affiliated to Church Mission Society but not employed or financially supported through CMS) and 16 short-termers. In 2015–16, Church Mission Society had a budget of £6.8 million, drawn primarily from donations by individuals and parishes, supplemented by historic investments.

The Church Mission Society Archive is housed at the University of Birmingham Special Collections.

In Australia, the society operates on two levels: firstly, at a national/federal level as 'CMS Australia', training and supporting various missionaries; and secondly, at a state level with 6 Branches, recruiting missionaries and liaising with supporters and support churches.

Leadership
Secretary or Honorary Secretary
 Thomas Scott (1799–1802)
 Josiah Pratt (1802–1824)
 Edward Bickersteth (1824–1831)
 Henry Venn (1841–1872)
 Henry Wright (1872–1880) 
 Frederic Wigram (1880–1895)
 Henry E. Fox (from 1895)

General Secretary
 1942 to 1963: Max Warren
 1963 to 1973: John Taylor
 1975 to 1985: Simon Barrington-Ward
 1989 to 1994: Michael Nazir-Ali
 1995 to 2000: Diana Witts
 2000 to 2011: Tim Dakin

Executive Leader
 October 2012 to 2018: Philip Mounstephen

Chief Executive Officer
 From May 2019: Alastair Bateman

President
 Admiral Gambier (first President, 1812–1834)
 Henry Pelham, 3rd Earl of Chichester (1834–1886)
 Captain the Hon. Francis Maude (1886–1887)
 Sir John Kennaway, 3rd Baronet (1887–1919)
 1969 to 1982: Diana Reader Harris
 1998 to 2007: Gillian Joynson-Hicks

See also

 History of Christian missions
 Church Missionary Society in the Middle East and North Africa
 Church Missionary Society in India
 Church Missionary Society in China

Notes

Bibliography
 Hewitt, Gordon, The Problems of Success, A History of the Church Missionary Society 1910–1942, Vol I (1971) In Tropical Africa. The Middle East.  At Home ;  Vol II (1977)Asia Overseas Partners 
 
.
.
.
 Ward, Kevin, and Brian Stanley, eds. The Church Mission Society and World Christianity, 1799-1999 (Eerdmans, 2000). excerpt
 Missionary Register; containing an abstract of the principal missionary and bible societies throughout the world. From 1816, containing the principal transactions of the various institutions for propagating the gospel with the proceedings at large of the Church Missionary Society. They were published from 1813–1855 by L. B. Seeley & Sons, London
Some are online readable and downloadable at Google Books; 1814, 1815, 1822, 1823, 1826, 1828, 1829, 1831, 1834, 1846.

External links

Church Mission Society
CMS Australia
New Zealand CMS
CMS Ireland

Religious organizations established in 1799
Church of England missions
Church of England missionary societies
Evangelical Anglicanism
Christian organizations established in the 18th century
Founders of Indian schools and colleges
Anglican organizations
Anglican organizations established in the 18th century
1799 establishments in Great Britain
Christian missionary societies